Henry Lytton, Jr. (2 July 1906 – 16 September 1965) was a British actor and singer who after a career in film and musical comedy ended as a pantomime dame and Ringmaster of the famous Blackpool Tower Circus in Blackpool.

'Harry' Lytton was born as Lord Alver Lytton in Chiswick in 1906, the youngest child of Gilbert and Sullivan performers Henry Lytton and Louie Henri. He was disinherited from his father's will as Lytton Sr. disapproved of his son's marriage to Jessie Matthews and his following a career in the theatre. However, on her death in 1947 he found himself in the will of his mother.

He was in The Charlot Show of 1925, while in the following year he was appearing as Reggie opposite the singer and dancer Jessie Matthews in The Charlot Show of 1926 at the Prince of Wales Theatre in London; following a whirlwind romance the two married in Hammersmith in London on 17 February 1926, aged 19 and 18 respectively. They divorced in November 1929 owing to Lytton's numerous infidelities. Lytton played Lord Campton in the musical comedy Virginia (1929) at the Palace Theatre in London and after on tour. In 1931 he was touring in the musical Here Comes The Bride opposite the Hollywood actress Pola Negri. He married the actress Barbara Joan Weale (1906-2000) in Kensington in London in 1931, and by 1939 the couple were living in Sunbury-on-Thames.

Lytton appeared in the pantomime Goody Two Shoes at the Grand Theatre in Leeds (1938); in High Time (1946-1947) with Nat Jackley and Tessie O'Shea, and in Here There and Everywhere (1947-1948) opposite Tommy Trinder - both at the London Palladium.

His film roles included George in After Dinner (1938) in which his wife Barbara Lytton also appeared, and George in Laugh It Off (1940), opposite Tommy Trinder in both, while his television appearances included four episodes of The Charlie Chester Show (1951).

From 1954 to his death Lytton lived at 229 St Walburgas Road in Blackpool in Lancashire, having moved there to take over as Ringmaster each summer at the Blackpool Tower Circus, a position he held to his death. During the Christmas period Lytton would appear as a pantomime dame, on one occasion appearing as such in Goody Two Shoes opposite Roy Hudd at the Empire Theatre in Leeds. Other panto appearances included Dame Horner in Jack and Jill (1948-1949) at the Manchester Hippodrome, Dame Horner  in Jack and Jill (1951-1952) and Queen Hysteria  in Little Miss Muffet (1952-1953, 1958-1959), the latter all at the New Palace Theatre of Varieties in Plymouth.

Henry Lytton, Jr. died of a heart attack in Blackpool in 1965 aged 59. In his will he left £1,205 to his widow Barbara Joan Lytton.

References

External links

1906 births
1965 deaths
People from Chiswick
People from Blackpool
English male singers
English male musical theatre actors
Ringmasters
20th-century British male singers